Lincoln Park is a park in San Francisco, California. Lincoln Park is the Western Terminus of the Lincoln Highway, the first road across the United States of America.

History 

The land on which Lincoln Park stands was the city-owned Golden Gate Cemetery, established in 1868. It held about 10,000 remains and included a Chinese burial ground and a potter's field.

In 1902, golf enthusiasts laid out a three-hole course on part of the land. In 1909, the Board of Supervisors turned the land over to the Parks Commission, and cemetery relocation began. The golf course expanded to 14 holes by 1914, then to a full 18 holes in 1917.

The Lincoln Highway, with its western terminus at Lincoln Park, was conceived and mapped in 1913 as the first coast-to-coast road across America, traversing 14 states. The original western terminus marker of the highway was located at the north end of the plaza and fountain in front of the Legion of Honor. Today, a replica of the western terminus marker and an interpretive plaque are located at the southwest corner of the plaza, next to the bus stop. The replica marker was placed in 2002 during the revitalized Lincoln Highway Association's 10th Annual National Convention by the Association's California Chapter.

In 1923, the park was chosen as the site of the California Palace of the Legion of Honor. The San Francisco Holocaust Memorial, designed by George Segal, was dedicated in the park in 1984.

References

Parks in San Francisco
Golden Gate National Recreation Area
Golf clubs and courses in California
Lincoln Highway
Richmond District, San Francisco
Protected areas established in 1909
1909 establishments in California